Gotta Get a Grip may refer to:

 Gotta Get a Grip (album), an album by MC Trouble
 "Gotta Get a Grip" (song), a song by Mick Jagger